To be distinguished from former president of Mali Amadou Toumani Touré
Ahmadou Touré is the Minister of Commerce, Mines and Industry of Mali since 24 April 2012.

References

Government ministers of Mali
Living people
Industry ministers
Year of birth missing (living people)
21st-century Malian people